Luis Vargas may refer to:

Luis Vargas (musician) (born 1961), Bachata musician from Dominican Republic
Luis de Vargas (1502–1568), Renaissance painter from Seville, Spain
Luis Vargas (gymnast) (born 1983), Puerto Rican gymnast
Luis Vargas (footballer) (born 2000), Chilean footballer